The Xylocopa iris is a species of carpenter bee.

It is found in Southwestern Europe.

References

iris
Hymenoptera of Europe
Fauna of the Iberian Peninsula
Insects described in 1791